Lee Da-seul (이다슬,  or  ; born November 8, 1996) is a South Korean racewalker. She competed at the 2016 Summer Olympics in the women's 20 kilometres walk but was disqualified.

References

1996 births
Living people
South Korean female racewalkers
Olympic athletes of South Korea
Athletes (track and field) at the 2016 Summer Olympics